Fritz Strich (13 December 1882 – 15 August 1963) was a Swiss-German literature historian.

Life 
Born in Königsberg, Strich was a student of Franz Muncker and became a lecturer at the Ludwig-Maximilians-Universität München in 1910. In 1915 he was appointed extraordinary professor in Munich and in 1929 professor at the University of Bern. In this way he escaped the persecution of Jews in the German Reich. In 1941 Strich was awarded the Swiss nationality and worked as a professor until his emeritus in 1953.

Strich was a member of the German Academy for Language and Poetry.

Strich's estate in the Burgerbibliothek Bern documents "above all [his] scientific work".

Strich died in Bern at the age of 80.

Publications 
 Franz Grillparzers Ästhetik, Berlin 1905; Reprint: Gerstenberg, Hildesheim 1977, 
 Die Mythologie in der deutschen Literatur. Von Klopstock bis Wagner, Halle 1910; Reprint: Francke, Bern 1970
 Deutsche Klassik und Romantik oder Vollendung und Unendlichkeit. Ein Vergleich. Meyer & Jessen, Munich 1922; 5. A. Francke, Bern 1962
 Dichtung und Zivilisation. Meyer & Jessen, Munich 1928
 Schiller. Sein Leben und sein Werk. Deutsche Buch-Gemeinschaft, Berlin 1928
 Der Dichter und die Zeit. Eine Sammlung von Reden und Vorträgen. Francke, Bern 1947
 Goethe und die Weltliteratur. Francke, Bern 1946; 2. verb. A. ebd. 1957
 Kunst und Leben. Vorträge und Abhandlungen zur deutschen Literatur. Francke, Bern 1960
 Goethes Faust. Francke, Bern 1964

Further reading 
 
  (edit.): Kurzbiographien zur Geschichte der Juden 1918–1945. Edited by the Leo Baeck Institute, Jerusalem. K. G. Saur, Munich 1988, .
 Strich, Fritz. In . Volume 19: Sand–Stri. Edited by Archiv Bibliographia Judaica. De Gruyter, Berlin among others. 2012, .

External links 
 
 Fritz Strich on Munzinger

References 

Germanists
Academic staff of the Ludwig Maximilian University of Munich
Academic staff of the University of Bern
1882 births
1963 deaths
Writers from Königsberg
German emigrants to Switzerland